Bennett Run is a stream located entirely within Lewis County, West Virginia.

Bennett Run was named for William Bennett, a pioneer settler.

See also
List of rivers of West Virginia

References

Rivers of Lewis County, West Virginia
Rivers of West Virginia